Sidney Wade (born 1951) is an American poet. She currently holds the position of Professor of creative writing at the University of Florida, where she has taught since 1993.

Biography
Wade was born in Englewood, New Jersey, in 1951. She attended the University of Vermont, receiving a Bachelor of Arts degree in philosophy in 1974 and an M.Ed. in counseling in 1978. She earned a Ph.D in English from the University of Houston in 1994.

Wade has published five poetry collections, including: Celestial Bodies (2002), Green (1998), From Istanbul/Istanbul'dan (1998), and Empty Sleeves (1990). Istanbul'dan/From Istanbul was published in Turkish and English by Yapi Kredi Publications. Wade's latest collection of poems, Stroke, was published by Persea Books. Her poems have also appeared in The New Yorker, Poetry Magazine, The New Republic, Southern Review, and other publications. She co-translated a selection from the poems of Melih Cevdet Anday together with Efe Murad under the title "Silent Stones: Selected Poems of Melih Cevdet Anday" (Northfield: Talisman, 2017) and was the winner of the 2015 Meral Divitci Prize. Some of these translations also appeared in literary journals such as "The American Reader", "Five Points", "Denver Quarterly", "Guernica", "Critical Flame", "Turkis Poetry Today" "Poet Lore", "Asymptote", and "Two Lines".

Wade received a Fulbright Fellowship and was a senior lecturer at Istanbul University from 1989–1990. She was awarded the Stanley P. Young Fellowship from the Bread Loaf Writers' Conference in 1994. Wade currently the president of the Association of Writers & Writing Programs.

Wade lives in Gainesville, Florida.

Work

Poetry
Stroke, Persea Books (forthcoming, January 2008)
Celestial Bodies, Louisiana State University Press (2002)
Green, University of South Carolina Press (1998)
From Istanbul/Istanbul'dan, Yapi Kredi Yayinlar, Istanbul (1998)
Empty Sleeves, University of Georgia Press (1991)

External links
Official website
Profile from the University of Florida
Profile from Verse Daily
 Sidney Wade's poem "Glory Train" in Gulf Coast: A Journal of Literature and Fine Arts (25.1).

1951 births
Living people
Poets from New Jersey
University of Florida faculty
University of Houston alumni
American women poets
American women academics
University of Vermont alumni
People from Englewood, New Jersey
21st-century American women